Justice Gardiner may refer to:

 Addison Gardiner, chief judge of the New York Court of Appeals from 1854 to 1855
 Gerald Gardiner, Baron Gardiner, Lord Chancellor of Britain from 1964 to 1970
 Robert Gardiner (Chief Justice) (1540–1620), Lord Chief Justice of Ireland from 1586 to 1604
 Stephen Gardiner, Lord Chancellor of Britain from 1553 to 1555

See also
Justice Gardner (disambiguation)